Talking Telephone Numbers is a British game show that aired on ITV from 28 February 1994 to 29 December 1997 and was hosted by Phillip Schofield and initially Emma Forbes, who was later replaced by Claudia Winkleman. The show's format features variety acts which will be used to generate numbers. Viewers will have the chance to win up to £25,000 if the five random numbers generated during the program match the last five digits of their telephone number in any order.

Format
An act would perform for everyone watching and play a short game that generated a number from 0 to 9. Five digits were selected in this manner, and these were meant to match the last five digits of a viewer's telephone number in any order. Viewers who did would call the show via an onscreen telephone number, and hopefully be answered by one of 96 telephonists. If one of the telephonists answered them, they would become a potential contestant. While the telephonists took in their calls, a pop singer would sing their latest single or a final act would perform.

A phone line was then picked at random, and that viewer would have a chance to win money. They would then have to answer three questions with numerical answers. Getting them all right won the game; an incorrect answer, however, resulted in another line being picked. This went on until someone won the game.

The winner of the game would be given a choice to either take £10,000 or take a cash prize attached to their telephonist (ranging from £1,000 to £25,000); regardless of choice, the telephonist would reveal their value, which almost nobody took.

International versions

Australia
An Australian version aired in early 1996 on the Seven Network hosted by Rob Elliott & Bridget Adams and was produced by Grundy and Celador (the show's format creator). It lasted three weeks before being cancelled due to low ratings.

Malaysia
In Malaysia, Talking Telephone Numbers aired on TV3 in 2002 hosted by Khairil Rashid sponsored by TM.

Serbia
In Serbia, Talking Telephone Numbers aired on RTS 1 in 2004-2005 hosted by Aleksandar Srećković & Nataša Pavlović.

Transmissions

References

External links

1994 British television series debuts
1997 British television series endings
1990s British game shows
Carlton Television
Television series by ITV Studios
English-language television shows
ITV game shows